Dobřany ( may refer to locations in the Czech Republic:

Dobřany, a town in the Plzeň Region
Dobřany (Rychnov nad Kněžnou District), a municipality and village in the Hradec Králové Region